Bernard Roberts (23 July 1933 – 3 November 2013) was an English pianist. He was born in Manchester. His treatment of the cycle of Beethoven's piano sonatas has been highly acclaimed.

He is also noted for his recordings of the music of Johann Sebastian Bach. Roberts' recording of the Well-Tempered Clavier, Books 1 and 2, performed on piano, was released in 1999 by Nimbus Records and was well received. Roberts also has recorded Bach's Six Partitas, BWV 825–30, and his French Suites, BWV 812–17. In collaboration with other performers, Roberts released discs of music for one and two pianos by Paul Hindemith and of trios by Frank Bridge.

According to Roberts' official home page, he has been the subject of a 40-minute BBC2 documentary, and he "particularly enjoys performing the piano trio repertoire with his sons Andrew and Nicholas".

Roberts commented that although he enjoyed making the Beethoven recordings, he feels his playing was somewhat restrained in the first "direct cut" recording.

References

External links
Bernard Roberts' official page, courtesy of his representative
Chetham's School of Music page on Bernard Roberts
Review of Roberts' "Well-Tempered Clavier" recording at The J.S. Bach Home Page
Review of Roberts' recording of Bach's Partitas at bach-cantatas.com

English classical pianists
Male classical pianists
1933 births
2013 deaths
Musicians from Manchester
20th-century classical pianists
20th-century English musicians
20th-century British male musicians
20th-century British musicians